Femina Miss India 2019 was the 56th edition of the Femina Miss India beauty pageant. It was held at Sardar Vallabhbhai Patel Indoor Stadium, Mumbai on June 15, 2019, and was hosted by Karan Johar, Manish Paul and Miss World 2017, Manushi Chhillar. At the end of the event, Anukreethy Vas of Tamil Nadu crowned Suman Rao of Rajasthan as her successor. She represented India at Miss World 2019 in London and placed 2nd Runner Up.

Meenakshi Chaudhary of Haryana crowned Shivani Jadhav of Chhattisgarh as Miss Grand India 2019. Gayatri Bhardwaj of New Delhi crowned Shreya Shanker of Bihar as Miss United Continents India 2019. Shreya Rao Kamavarapu of Andhra Pradesh sashed Sanjana Vij of Telangana as Runner-Up at the end of the event. From this batch also, the winner of Miss Universe 2021 Harnaaz Sandhu made it to the top 12.

Results 
Color keys

Background 
There are four regions under which the contestants are grouped - North, South, East and West. Mentors will train contestants for the finale.
 East Zone & West Zone - Neha Dhupia - Femina Miss India Universe 2002
 North & South Zone - Dia Mirza - Miss Asia Pacific 2000

Sub Title Awards

Bennett University Sports day

Zonal sub-contest winners 
The following are the list of sub-contest award winners from each zones:

Judges 

Femina Miss India 2019 Award Night
 Dia Mirza — Miss Asia Pacific 2000
 Mukesh Chhabra — Indian casting director
 Neha Dhupia — Miss India Universe 2002

Miss India 2019 Grand Finale
 Vanessa Ponce — Miss World 2018
 Shane Peacock — Fashion designer
 Falguni Peacock — Fashion designer
 Dutee Chand — Sprinter
 Aayush Sharma — Actor
 Sunil Chhetri — Indian Footballer
 Chitrangada Singh — Actress
 Huma Qureshi — Actress
 Remo D'Souza — Choreographer and director

Contestants
The following is the list of the official delegates of Miss India 2019 representing 30 states of the country:
Color key

State finalists 
The following is the list of delegates who made to the top 3 state finalists. There were no top 3 finalists for North Eastern states since these states usually have direct appointment of state representatives during Guwahati audition:

Panelists

Skin Care Expert: Dr Jamuna Pai
Personality Skills Mentor: Sanjeev Datta & Viram Datta
Gym Partner: Body Sculptor
Official Photographer: Anand Wahane
Hair Coach: Kromakay
Salon Expert: Savio John Pereira
Make-up Coach: Clint Fernandes

Controversy 
This edition of the pageant stirred a controversy over Twitter where the Miss India team was accused of selecting 'fair-skinned' women to run in the pageant. People also pointed towards the fact that the girls looked similar and that the diversity of the country was not visible. However, the pageant organizers rubbished all the claims. They also made a video regarding the same topic, stating that many of their past winners and contestant came from all corners of the country and had different ethnicity.

Notes

 : The crowning of the winner from the North state, Jammu and Kashmir was during the final event of West zonal crowning which held on 14 April 2019 in Pune. This was due to the delayed audition held in the state since the state was under emergency as a result of Pulwama terrorist attack.

Replacements

References

External links
 Miss India official website

2019
2019 beauty pageants
2019 in India
Beauty pageants in India